Yenibahçe can refer to:

 Yenibahçe, Maden
 Yenibahçe, Silifke